Glenbeulah is a village in Sheboygan County, Wisconsin, United States. The population was 463 at the 2010 census. It is included in the Sheboygan, Wisconsin Metropolitan Statistical Area. Glenbeulah is situated on the Mullet River.

History
A post office called Glenbeulah has been in operation since 1860. Glenbeulah was named from its setting in a glen, and in honor of Beulah, the mother of a railroad contractor.

Geography
Glenbeulah is located at  (43.796630, -88.045834).

Demographics

2010 census
As of the census of 2010, there were 463 people, 194 households, and 134 families living in the village. The racial makeup of the village was 98.7% White, 0.2% Native American, 0.4% from other races, and 0.6% from two or more races. Hispanic or Latino of any race were 1.1% of the population.

There were 194 households, of which 32.0% had children under the age of 18 living with them, 55.7% were married couples living together, 7.2% had a female householder with no husband present, 6.2% had a male householder with no wife present, and 30.9% were non-families. 22.2% of all households were made up of individuals, and 9.7% had someone living alone who was 65 years of age or older. The average household size was 2.39 and the average family size was 2.81.

The median age in the village was 41.4 years. 22% of residents were under the age of 18; 5% were between the ages of 18 and 24; 27.8% were from 25 to 44; 33.1% were from 45 to 64; and 12.1% were 65 years of age or older. The gender makeup of the village was 50.8% male and 49.2% female.

2000 census
As of the census of 2000, there were 378 people, 153 households, and 108 families living in the village. The population density was 563.2 people per square mile (217.8/km2). There were 160 housing units at an average density of 238.4 per square mile (92.2/km2). The racial makeup of the village was 99.47% White, 0.53% from other races. Hispanic or Latino of any race were 0.53% of the population.

There were 153 households, out of which 33.3% had children under the age of 18 living with them, 61.4% were married couples living together, 6.5% had a female householder with no husband present, and 29.4% were non-families. 22.9% of all households were made up of individuals, and 7.8% had someone living alone who was 65 years of age or older. The average household size was 2.47 and the average family size was 2.97.

In the village, the population was spread out, with 24.1% under the age of 18, 7.1% from 18 to 24, 33.6% from 25 to 44, 22.8% from 45 to 64, and 12.4% who were 65 years of age or older. The median age was 37 years. For every 100 females, there were 103.2 males. For every 100 females age 18 and over, there were 99.3 males.

The median income for a household in the village was $42,656, and the median income for a family was $47,045. Males had a median income of $32,411 versus $20,568 for females. The per capita income for the village was $17,240. None of the families and 1.9% of the population were living below the poverty line, including no under eighteens and 10.3% of those over 64.

Notable people

 Thomas Armstrong, Wisconsin State Representative
 Emery Crosby, Wisconsin State Representative
 Glenn Grothman, United States House of Representatives
 Edwin Slade, Wisconsin State Assembly
 William Van Pelt, United States House of Representatives

Images

See also
 List of villages in Wisconsin

References

External links

 

Villages in Sheboygan County, Wisconsin
Villages in Wisconsin